Ti ho sposato per allegria (internationally released as I Married You for Fun) is a 1967 Italian comedy film directed by Luciano Salce. It is based on the play by Natalia Ginzburg.

Monica Vitti was awarded the Globo d'oro for Best Actress, while Maria Grazia Buccella won a Silver Ribbon for Best supporting Actress.

U.S. Release 
The film includes a nude love scene, which contributed to an "X" rating when it was released in the United States in 1969. No one under 16 could attend without a parent or guardian. It was among a record high 28 films condemned by the National Catholic Office for Motion Pictures that year.

Cast 
Monica Vitti: Giuliana 
Giorgio Albertazzi: Pietro 
Michel Bardinet: The Englishman
Maria Grazia Buccella: Victoria 
Rossella Como: Hyacinth

References

External links

1967 films
Films directed by Luciano Salce
Italian comedy films
Commedia all'italiana
1967 comedy films
1960s Italian films